Peter Anthony Adams (May 4, 1951 – April 6, 2019) was a former American football guard.

Professional career
Adams played four seasons in the National Football League with the Cleveland Browns.

College career
Adams played college football at the University of Southern California after transferring from San Diego City College.

High school career
Adams prepped at University of San Diego High School.

References

1951 births
2019 deaths
Players of American football from San Diego
American football offensive guards
USC Trojans football players
Cleveland Browns players
San Diego City Knights football players